Amt Golßener Land is a former Amt ("collective municipality") in the district of Dahme-Spreewald, in Brandenburg, Germany. Its seat was in the town Golßen. It merged into the Amt Unterspreewald on 1 January 2013.

The Amt Golßener Land consisted of the following municipalities:
Drahnsdorf
Golßen
Kasel-Golzig
Steinreich

Demography

References

Golssener
Dahme-Spreewald